Rəhimli or Rahimli or Ragimly may refer to:

Villages of Azerbaijan : 
Rəhimli, Goranboy, Azerbaijan
Rəhimli, Davachi, Azerbaijan
Rəhimli, Gadabay, Azerbaijan
Rəhimli, Agsu, Azerbaijan
Rəhimli, Kalbajar, Azerbaijan